...Say When is the fifth studio album by American singer Nicolette Larson. It was produced by Emory Gordy Jr. and Tony Brown, and released by MCA Records in 1985.

Background
Having signed with MCA in 1983, ...Say When was Larson's first of two country albums for the label. It peaked at No. 48 on the Billboard Top Country Albums and remained on the chart for twenty weeks. Three singles were released from the album. "Only Love Will Make It Right" was released in January 1985 and reached No. 42 on Billboard's Hot Country Songs. "When You Get a Little Lonely", released in May, reached No. 46. The final single, "Building Bridges", was released in September and peaked at No. 72.

In 2012, Raven Records gave the album its first CD release, as a double-album set with Larson's 1986 follow-up album Rose of My Heart.

Critical reception

Upon release, Billboard considered Larson a "high energy addition to the new breed of today's country artists". They felt the album "spins through a kaleidoscope of material" and picked "When You Get a Little Lonely" as the album's "strong contender". Cash Box commented: "Thoroughly satisfying vocally, melodically and lyrically from start to finish, this latest album is further proof of Larson's consistent versatility as a performer."

In a retrospective review, Stephen Thomas Erlewine of AllMusic felt the album showed Larson "[diving] headfirst into contemporary country". He commented: "The bright, punchy sound is far removed from the lush, hazy SoCal soft rock of her five albums and it's right in line with the crisp sound coming of Nashville in the mid-'80s. The record stands as a strong slice of Reagan-era commercial country."

Track listing

Personnel
Technical
Jeff Adamoff - art direction
Alan Messer - photography

Chart performance

References

1985 albums
Nicolette Larson albums
MCA Records albums
Albums produced by Emory Gordy Jr.
Albums produced by Tony Brown (record producer)